The Commonwealth of Britain Bill was a bill first introduced in the House of Commons in 1991 by Tony Benn, then a Labour Member of Parliament (MP). It was seconded by the future Leader of the Labour Party, Jeremy Corbyn.

The Bill proposed abolishing the British monarchy, with the United Kingdom becoming a "democratic, federal and secular Commonwealth of Britain", or in effect a republic with a codified constitution. It was introduced by Benn a number of times until Benn's retirement in 2001, but never achieved a second reading. Under the Bill:

The monarchy would be abolished and the constitutional status of the Crown ended;
The Church of England would be disestablished;
The head of state would be a president, elected by a joint sitting of both Houses of the Commonwealth Parliament; 
The functions of the royal prerogative would be transferred to Parliament;
The Privy Council would be abolished, and replaced by a Council of State;
The House of Lords would be replaced by an elected House of the People, with equal representation of men and women;
The House of Commons would similarly have equal representation of men and women;
England, Scotland and Wales would have their own devolved National Parliaments with responsibility for devolved matters as agreed; 
County Court judges and magistrates would be elected; and
British jurisdiction over Northern Ireland would be ended.
The judiciary would be reformed and a National Legal Service would be created.
The Constitution would be codified and an amendment process established.
The voting age would be lowered from 18 to 16.
MPs and other officials would swear oaths to the Constitution, not the Crown.

See also

 Charter 88
 Common Sense (book)
 Commonwealth
 Commonwealth of Europe Bill
 Constitutional reform in the United Kingdom
 Disestablishmentarianism
 Irreligion in the United Kingdom
 Labour for a Republic
 Oath of Allegiance (United Kingdom)
 Reform of the House of Lords
 Religion in the United Kingdom
 Republic (political organisation)
 Republicanism in the United Kingdom
 Secularity
 Separation of church and state
 United Ireland

References

Benn revives Bill to replace monarch with a president The Independent, 12 December 1992
 Tony Benn’s Plan to Democratise Britain – and Abolish the Monarchy

1991 in British law
1991 in British politics
Church of England disestablishment
Constitution of the United Kingdom
Federalism in the United Kingdom
Home rule in the United Kingdom
Jeremy Corbyn
Proposed laws of the United Kingdom
Republicanism in the United Kingdom
Separation of church and state
Tony Benn